Gustave Adolphe Lefrançais (1826–1901) was a Communard and member of the First International and Jura Federation.

References

1826 births
1901 deaths
People from Angers
Members of the International Workingmen's Association
Burials at Père Lachaise Cemetery
Communards
French socialists
Jura Federation

French anarchists